Sheykh Mohammad Rezayi (also Romanized as Sheykh Moḩammad Reẕāyī) is a village in Khafri Rural District, in the Central District of Sepidan County, Fars Province, Iran. At the 2006 census, its population was 46, in 12 families.

References 

Populated places in Sepidan County